Julie Van Rosendaal is a Calgary-based Canadian food writer. Her 2021 social media post about increasingly hard butter triggered the Buttergate scandal in Canada.

Career 

Van Rosendaal has worked for the Canadian Broadcasting Corporation, Parents Canada magazine, Western Living magazine and co-hosted the It's Just Food television program.

In February 2021, Van Rosendaal drew attention to the increasing hardness of Canadian butter in what became known as Buttergate in a social media post. In 2022, she hosted an online cooking class for 1,000 school students.

She is the author of eight cookbooks including Dirty Food and Starting Out.

Personal life 
Van Rosendaal lives in Calgary, Alberta with her husband and son.

References

External links 

 Dinner with Julie, blog
 Julie van Rosendaal on why she decided to self-publish her new cookbook, The Globe and Mail, 2020,

Year of birth missing (living people)
Living people
Writers from Calgary
21st-century Canadian women writers
Canadian food writers
21st-century Canadian writers
Canadian women bloggers
Canadian bloggers